Daniel Joseph Sullivan (born September 1, 1939) is a former American football offensive lineman in the National Football League (NFL) from 1962 through 1972. During that span he appeared Super Bowl III as the starting right guard and Super Bowl V as the starting right tackle for the Baltimore Colts. He played college football for Boston College.

References

1939 births
Living people
Players of American football from Boston
American football offensive guards
American football offensive tackles
John D. O'Bryant School of Mathematics & Science alumni
Boston College Eagles football players
Baltimore Colts players